Petrit Hoxhaj (born 5 February 1990) is a Dutch footballer who plays as a midfielder for PKC '83 in the Dutch Eerste Klasse.

Career
In 1994, Hoxhaj's family fled from Kosovo to the Netherlands. He played in youth at amateur club FC Grootegast and since 2002 at FC Groningen. In 2003 his family was threatened with deportation. In 2009, he exchanged the youth academy of Groningen for SC Veendam. Hoxhaj made his debut on 12 March 2010 against Volendam, coming on as a substitute in the 82nd minute for Lars Lambooij. A year later, on 4 March 2011, the midfielder scored his first goal for Veendam in a 4–1 win against Fortuna Sittard.

Hoxhaj played in the lower tiers of Dutch football, after leaving Veendam in 2012. First, he played one season for WKE, before moving to Be Quick 1887. He then joined Pelikaan-S who had recently been promoted to the ninth-tier Vierde Klasse in March 2014. There, he would play alongside former professional players such as FC Groningen legend Martin Drent and Kurt Elshot, and reach successive promotions. Following three years at the club, he moved to VV Katwijk in March 2017. Already in April 2019 it was confirmed, at Hoxhaj would join ACV Assen in the Dutch Hoofdklasse from the 2019–20 season. In April 2020, it was announced that he would join Eerste Klasse club PKC '83 together with his brother Handrit Hoxhaj.

Personal life
After retiring from professional football, Hoxhaj continued working as an account manager at IT advisor Bossers & Cnossen in Groningen.

References

External links

1990 births
Living people
Dutch footballers
FC Groningen players
WKE players
SC Veendam players
Be Quick 1887 players
VV Katwijk players
Eerste Divisie players
Tweede Divisie players
Derde Divisie players
Association football midfielders
Dutch people of Kosovan descent
Asser Christelijke Voetbalvereniging players